Chernihivska is a Ukrainian name. It may refer to:
 Chernihivska (Kyiv Metro), a station on the Kyiv Metro
 Chernihivska Oblast of Ukraine